Nishada impervia is a moth of the family Erebidae first described by Francis Walker in 1864. It is found in New Guinea, Papua New Guinea and on Seram. The habitat consists of lowland areas.

References

Lithosiina
Moths described in 1864